Luleh (also Romanized as Lūleh; also known as Kūh Lūleh) is a village in Bandan Rural District, in the Central District of Nehbandan County, South Khorasan Province, Iran. At the 2006 census, its population was 139, in 27 families.

References 

Populated places in Nehbandan County